Yuma is a 1971 American Western television film directed by Ted Post and starring Clint Walker. It was shot in Old Tucson.  The film was originally a television pilot that appeared on the ABC Movie of the Week.

Plot 
Dave Harmon (Clint Walker), a former lieutenant in the U.S. Army is sent to Yuma as the new United States Marshal. His wife was raped and son killed and the only description of the criminals responsible was they were wearing army uniforms. He has served in several locations as U.S. Marshal and all were near an army post. Yuma is a city with an army post commanded by Major Lucas (Peter Mark Richman) and an Indian reservation nearby.

Harmon rides into Yuma as the newly assigned Marshal and immediately encounters two drunk rabble rousers, the King brothers, who have hijacked a stagecoach outside of town. One is killed in a saloon by Harmon when he draws his gun, and Harmon locks the other in the town jail.

The second brother is subsequently murdered, shot in the back, using a gun from the Marshal's office during a nighttime jail break organized by Sanders (Robert Phillips), who is an associate of the freight company owner (Barry Sullivan), in an effort to get the third King brother, cattleman (Morgan Woodward) to kill the Marshal.

The murderer had tricked army Captain White (John Kerr) into coming with him to the jail and being an accomplice to the crime, as the freight owner, his employee Sanders, and the Captain are all involved in an ongoing scheme to defraud the Indians out of cattle they need for food that is due them according to a treaty.

The only witness to the break-in is Andres, a Mexican orphan boy that had earlier been taken in by Harmon.  He was asleep on the floor in the jail when awoken by the noise of the break-in but only manages to see the intruders boots - one pair being the US Cavalry army boots worn by Captain White (this clue would later give Harmon the lead to investigate at the nearby army post).

The elder King brother rides into town and demands justice. He gives Harmon time to find his other brother's killer or he will return with his men and kill the Marshal. Marshal Harmon, showing no fear, but only a desire to do his official duty, sets out to find the killer and unravel the related corruption involving the Indians, who also threaten to revolt, but come to his assistance as the story unfolds.

Cast 
 Clint Walker as U.S. Marshal Dave Harmon
 Barry Sullivan  as  Nels Decker, freight company owner
 Kathryn Hays as  Julie Williams, the hotel owner
 Edgar Buchanan as  Mules McNeil, a competing freight company owner
 Morgan Woodward as Arch King, cattleman
 John Kerr as Captain White
 Peter Mark Richman as Major Lucas
 Bing Russell as Rol King
 Robert Phillips as Sanders
 Miguel Alejandro as Andres, a Mexican orphan boy hired by Harmon to work in the jail

References

External links
 

1971 television films
American Western (genre) television films
1970s English-language films
Films directed by Ted Post
ABC Movie of the Week
Television pilots not picked up as a series
Films scored by George Duning
United States Marshals Service in fiction